The men's bantamweight (54 kg/118.8 lbs) Low-Kick division at the W.A.K.O. European Championships 2004 in Budva was the second lightest of the male Low-Kick tournaments and involved five fighters.  Each of the matches was three rounds of two minutes each and were fought under Low-Kick kickboxing rules.

As there were too few fighters for a tournament designed for eight, three of the men received a bye through to the semi finals.  The gold medal was won by Alexander Sidorov from Moldova who defeated Russia's Ayup Arsaev in the final by unanimous decision.  Defeated semi finalists Boban Marinkovic from Serbia and Montenegro and Dzmitry Baranau from Belarus received bronze medals.

Results
These matches ended in a split decision.

See also
List of WAKO Amateur European Championships
List of WAKO Amateur World Championships
List of male kickboxers

References

External links
 WAKO World Association of Kickboxing Organizations Official Site

W.A.K.O. European Championships 2004 (Budva)